Gahnia novocaledonensis is a tussock-forming perennial in the family Cyperaceae, that is native to parts of New Caledonia.

References

novocaledonensis
Plants described in 1940
Flora of New Caledonia